Marco Mirnegg (born 24 June 1982) is a former professional tennis player from Austria.

Biography
Born in Linz, he is the son of former Austrian football international Dieter Mirnegg.

Mirnegg, who was coached by Jürgen Waber, turned professional in 2002. He won three Challenger titles and in satellite tournaments had wins over Nicolás Almagro and Roberto Bautista Agut. His only main draw appearance on the ATP Tour came at St. Pölten in 2005, where he featured in both the singles and doubles competitions. He played a Davis Cup match for Austria in 2005, against Australia in Sydney. In the reverse singles, with the tie lost, Mirnegg was called up to face Todd Woodbridge and lost a close match to the Australian doubles specialist 5–7 in the final set.

Challenger titles

Singles: (3)

See also
List of Austria Davis Cup team representatives

References

External links
 
 
 

1982 births
Living people
Austrian male tennis players
Sportspeople from Linz